St Catherine's College may refer to:

U.K.
 St Catharine's College, Cambridge, one of the constituent colleges of the University of Cambridge, England
 St Catherine's College, Oxford, one of the constituent colleges of the University of Oxford, England
 St Catherine's College, Eastbourne, a Church of England academy in Eastbourne, England
 St Catherine's College, Armagh, Northern Ireland
 St Catherine's College of Education for Home Economics, a defunct college in Dublin, Ireland
 St Catherine's College, Wellington, New Zealand

U.S.
 St. Catharine College, near Springfield, Kentucky
 College of St. Catherine, St. Catherine University in Saint Paul and Minneapolis, Minnesota

See also
 St. Catherine College or Colégio Santa Catarina, a Catholic school located in Novo Hamburgo, Rio Grande do Sul, Brazil
St. Catherine University (Japan), Matsuyama, Ehime, Japan
University of Santa Catalina, El Burgo de Osma, Spain
St. Catherine University, Saint Paul and Minneapolis, Minnesota, United States
St. Catherine (disambiguation)
St Catherine's School (disambiguation)